SS Léopoldville was a  passenger liner of the Compagnie Belge Maritime du Congo. As a result, about 763 US soldiers and 56 of the ship's crew died.

Description

She had  of refrigerated cargo space.

The ship was built with two 1,019 nhp 4-cylinder quadruple-expansion steam engines which had cylinder diameters of 28 inch (73.5 cm), 33 inch (86 cm), 48 inch (123 cm) and 68 inch (175 cm) diameter by 48 inch (123 cm) stroke. The engines drove twin screw propellers.

In 1936 two Bauer-Wach low-pressure exhaust turbines were added, each driving one of the shafts via double-reduction gearing and a Föttinger fluid coupling. Each turbine ran on exhaust steam from the piston engine on the same shaft. The turbines increased Léopoldvilles total power to 1,197 NHP.

Service
She was built for the Compagnie Maritime Belge as the fifth to bear the name Léopoldville and initially served on the route between Belgium and its African colony, the Belgian Congo. Her Belgian Official Number was 120. Her code letters were MLTP until 1933–34, when they were superseded by the call sign ONLB.

In 1939 the UK Admiralty chartered Léopoldville. After her cargo hold was fitted with rudimentary benches, the ship completed 24 cross-Channel crossings, transporting more than 120,000 troops. A 24-man DEMS detachment manned defensive guns. The ship's Belgian crew, including 93 Africans from the Belgian Congo, received orders in Flemish. Captain Charles Limbor, who assumed command in 1942, spoke no English.

Sinking
Léopoldville was hastily loaded for the Battle of the Bulge with 2,223 reinforcements from the 262nd and 264th Regiments, 66th Infantry Division of the United States Army. The soldiers' regimental command structure was fragmented by loading troops as they arrived rather than according to their units. There was an insufficient number of life jackets, and few troops participated in the poorly supervised lifeboat drill as Léopoldville sailed from Southampton at 09:00 24 December as part of convoy WEP-3 across the English Channel to Cherbourg.

Léopoldville was within five miles from the coast of Cherbourg at 17:54 when one of two torpedoes launched by  struck the starboard side aft and exploded in the number 4 hold, killing about three hundred men as compartments E-4, F-4 and G-4 flooded. Few US soldiers understood the abandon ship instructions given in Flemish. While some soldiers joined the crew in departing lifeboats, many did not realize the ship was slowly sinking, and stayed aboard anticipating the ship would be towed ashore by a tug. While the other escorts searched for the U-boat,  came alongside the sinking ship. Soldiers on Léopoldville jumped down onto the smaller Brilliant. The destroyer could take only five hundred men and headed for the shore leaving some twelve hundred soldiers aboard.

Jack Dixon was a 21-year-old seaman on board HMS Brilliant. He and other crew members battled against the conditions to try and rescue as many of the soldiers as possible. From his web site:

"H.M.S. Brilliant went along the port side of the troopship we had put our starboard fenders over the side; the sea swell was causing a rise and fall of between 8 ft and 12 ft. The scrambling nets were hanging down the Léopoldvilles port side and the US soldiers were coming down on to our upper deck. Some men had started to jump down from a height of approximately 40 feet. Unfortunately limbs were being broken when they landed on the torpedo tubes and other fixed equipment on the starboard side of the upper deck; some men fell between the two vessels and were crushed as the two vessels crashed into each other. To avoid any further injuries, if possible, all our hammocks were brought up from our mess-decks below and laid on the starboard upper deck to cushion the fall of the soldiers as they landed."

While the escorts focused on searching for the U-boat and rescuing survivors, they failed to respond to blinking light signals from Cherbourg. Brilliant attempted radio communications, but could not communicate directly with the Americans at Fort L'Ouest in Cherbourg because the Americans used a different radio frequency and could not read the British code. Brilliant contacted HMNB Portsmouth, which telephoned Cherbourg; but shore post communications, decisions, and orders were significantly slowed by minimal staffing during attendance at holiday parties.

It took nearly an hour for Cherbourg to realise Léopoldville was sinking. Several hundred Allied vessels in the harbor at Cherbourg might have served as rescue craft, but all had cold engines while many of their crewmen were ashore celebrating the holiday. Allied forces enjoying their Christmas Eve dinner in Cherbourg failed to mobilize a rescue effort before Léopoldville sank by the stern at 20:40. Belated efforts by ships including  rescued some survivors.

In 1998 the History Channel broadcast the documentary film Cover Up: The Sinking of the SS Léopoldville which included interviews with numerous survivors of the sinking of the ship from the 66th Infantry Division and sailors from the US Navy who attempted to save them by pulling them out of the water. The sailors claimed that they arrived after the sinking of the ship and that most of the men who they pulled out of the water had already frozen to death in the water by the time they arrived on the scene.

Of the 2,235 US servicemen on board, about 515 are presumed to have gone down with the ship. Another 248 died from injuries, drowning, or hypothermia. Captain Charles Limbor, one Belgian and three Congolese crewmembers also went down with the ship. An unknown number of British soldiers died. Documents about the attack remained classified until 1996. The soldiers of the 66th Infantry Division were ordered not to tell anyone about the sinking of the ship and their letters home were censored by the Army during the rest of World War II. After the war, the soldiers were also ordered at discharge not to talk about the sinking of SS Léopoldville to the press and told that their GI benefits as civilians would be canceled if they did so.

Discovery of the wreck
In July 1984, Clive Cussler of NUMA claimed to have discovered the wreck, although French maritime officials claim the location of the shipwreck had always been marked on all maritime charts since its size and location present a potential hazard to navigation. Cussler asserts that the wreck is wrongly located, its true position being about a mile to the south.

In 1997, the 66th Infantry Division Monument was dedicated in Fort Benning, Georgia in memory of the soldiers who died aboard Léopoldville and also to those who survived the attack on Léopoldville but were later killed in action.

In 2005, a memorial was erected in Veterans Memorial Park in Titusville, Florida.

Clive Cussler dedicated his 1986 book Cyclops to the disaster. The dedication reads:

In 2009, the National Geographic Channel aired a special that recreated the events that led to the sinking and had divers investigating the wreck.

There is a memorial in Weymouth, Dorset engraved with:

See also
 List by death toll of ships sunk by submarines

References

Bibliography

External links
 
 
 
  – directed by Lawrence Bond
 Survivors of the Leopoldville by Ray Roberts 
 
 
 The Sunken Mysteries of Britain's Wartime Shipping Lanes: Link

1928 ships
Ocean liners
Passenger ships of Belgium
Ships built in Belgium
Ships sunk by German submarines in World War II
Steamships of Belgium
Troop ships of the United Kingdom
World War II merchant ships of Belgium
World War II shipwrecks in the English Channel
Maritime incidents in December 1944
Ministry of War Transport ships